Anthony Baxter may refer to:
 Anthony S. Baxter, British journalist and broadcaster
 Anthony Baxter (filmmaker), British documentary director and producer